Mahatsinjo may refer to the following places in Madagascar:

Mahatsinjo, Maevatanana
Mahatsinjo, Vondrozo
Mahatsinjo Est